Silvacane Abbey is a former Cistercian monastery in the municipality of La Roque-d'Anthéron, Bouches-du-Rhône, in Provence, France. It was founded in or around 1144 as a daughter house of Morimond Abbey and was dissolved in 1443; it ceased to be an ecclesiastical property in the French Revolution. The church was acquired by the French state in 1846, the remaining buildings not until 1949. It is one of the three Cistercian abbeys in Provence known as the "three sisters of Provence" ("les trois soeurs provençales"), the other two being Sénanque Abbey and Le Thoronet Abbey; Silvacane was possibly the last-established.

The structures, of the late 12th and 13th centuries, are mostly Romanesque, with some Gothic elements. As is usual with early Cistercian buildings, the focus of the architecture is entirely on simplicity, austerity and harmony. The church interior, without decoration or distraction, is an outstanding example of 12th century Cistercian architecture.

History

Like all Cistercian monasteries of the time, Silvacane was sited in a remote location next to a river or stream, in this case the Durance River, in an area overgrown with reeds.

The abbey became prosperous towards the end of the 12th century when it received valuable endowments from Guillaume de Fuveau and Raimond de Baux. This wealth however provoked the envy of the Benedictines of Montmajour Abbey near Arles, who attacked Silvacane in 1289 and took the Cistercians hostage (they were later released, after much negotiation).

In 1358 the abbey was plundered by the troops of the army of Aubignan, and from this time on its financial problems grew, until in 1443 the monks were obliged to abandon the abbey. The buildings became the property of the chapter of Aix Cathedral and the church was turned into the parish church of La Roque-d’Anthéron.

The buildings fell into disrepair during the 17th and 18th centuries. The abbey premises were auctioned off during the French Revolution and became a farm. After the site had passed through a number of private hands the church was bought by the French government in 1846 and declared an historical monument, and restoration work initiated. The other buildings of the complex received little attention, however; the state did not acquire them until 1949, and serious restoration took place only in the 1990s.

Architecture
  The abbey church was constructed between 1175 and 1230 in predominantly Romanesque style with some Gothic elements on the highest part of the terrain. The building, a basilica with transepts, has a pointed barrel vault, with a plain ribbed vault at the crossing, on substantial cruciform columns, the capitals of which, in the form of very simple foliage motifs, are very finely carved.

The chapter house and the day-room, in the east range, and the cloister were all constructed in the 13th century, the cloister with plain Romanesque arches and the day room has a Gothic vaulted ceiling, also of the 13th century.

To the north of the cloister is the refectory, rebuilt in the late 13th century in the more elaborate rayonnant Gothic style. This is the most ornate of the monastery buildings, built at a time when the order had relaxed some of the more rigorous rules of Bernard of Clairvaux.

Present use
The church and other buildings are no longer used for religious purposes. They are open to the public and are sometimes used for cultural events, including the Piano Festival de La Roque-d'Anthéron, the Silvacane Festival of Vocal Music at Silvacane, and the Festival International de Quatuors à Cordes du Luberon.

Photo gallery

Notes

Sources
 Abbayesprovencales.free.fr: Silvacane 
 Abbeys in Provence: Silvacane 
 Monuments nationaux: Silvacane

References

 Dimier, Père Anselme, 1982: L'art cistercien, pp. 313–321. Edition Zodiaque: La Pierre-qui-Vire. 
 Fixot, Michel: Le Thoronet et Silvacane. Porteries et bâtiments d'accueil cisterciens, in "Dossiers d'Archéologie", December 1997- January 1998, n. 229. 
 Fleischhauer, Carsten, 2003: Die Baukunst der Zisterzienser in der Provence: Sénanque - Le Thoronet - Silvacane. Abteilung Architekturgeschichte des Kunsthistorischen Instituts der Universität zu Köln. Cologne University. 
 Leroux-Dhuys, Jean-Francois, 1999: Cisterciënzer Abdijen: Geschiedenis en architectuur. Könemann: Keulen.  
 Molina, Nathalie, nd:  L'abbaye de Silvacane. Monum. Editions du patrimoine: Paris.  (also available in French, German and Italian) 
 Molina, Nathalie: Silvacane, la petite sœur provençale, in "Dossiers d'Archéologie", June - July 1998, n. 234  
 Toman, Freigang & Bednorz, 1999: La Provence. Art, architecture et paysages. Könemann: Cologne.

External links

 Romanes.com: pictures
  

Cistercian monasteries in France
Buildings and structures in Bouches-du-Rhône
Romanesque architecture in Provence
1144 establishments in Europe
1140s establishments in France
Religious organizations established in the 1140s
Christian monasteries established in the 12th century
Churches in Bouches-du-Rhône